The gare de Saint-Gaudens is a railway station in Saint-Gaudens, Occitanie, France. The station is located on the Toulouse–Bayonne railway line. The station is served by Intercités (long distance) and TER (local) services operated by the SNCF.

Train services
The following services currently call at Saint-Gaudens:
intercity services (Intercités) Hendaye–Bayonne–Pau–Tarbes–Toulouse
local service (TER Occitanie) Toulouse–Saint-Gaudens–Tarbes–Pau

References

Railway stations in Haute-Garonne
Railway stations in France opened in 1862